The 1932 United States presidential election in California took place on November 8, 1932 as part of the 1932 United States presidential election. State voters chose 22 representatives, or electors, to the Electoral College, who voted for president and vice president.

California voted for the Democratic challenger, New York Governor Franklin Roosevelt, in a landslide over the Republican incumbent, Herbert Hoover, carrying every county except Riverside.

Roosevelt became the first Democrat to gain an absolute majority of the vote in California since Franklin Pierce in 1852, and in winning all but one county he broke numerous long streaks of Republican dominance. Alpine and Orange Counties had never voted Democratic before this election, Alameda County had last voted for a Democrat in 1856, Humboldt County had never been Democratic since Stephen Douglas carried it in 1860, San Bernardino and Santa Clara Counties had not voted Democratic since Horatio Seymour in 1868, and Los Angeles County previously supported a Democrat with Samuel J. Tilden in 1876.

FDR’s victory was the first of five consecutive Democratic victories in the state, as California would not vote Republican again until Dwight Eisenhower won the state in 1952. This would also be the last time until 1992 that a non-incumbent Democrat would carry California in a presidential election.

Results

Results by county

References

Notes

1932 California elections
California
1932